Portals is a global public art initiative that connects people around the globe through real-time video audiovisual technology housed inside a gold-painted, converted shipping container or other structure. Individuals and groups enter local Portals and engage with individuals or groups in distant Portals through live, full-body video conferencing. The experience has been described as "breathing the same air." Portals are placed in public spaces such as public squares, museums, university campuses, high-level summits, and refugee camps. Participation is free, and the spaces are maintained by staff called Portal_Curators.

History 
The project was started in 2014 by artist Amar Bakshi, and initially connected the cities of New York and Tehran. According to Bakshi, he started the project "to connect people who wouldn't otherwise meet.” He had the idea to start the project after his days as a foreign journalist, where he launched How the World Sees America for The Washington Post. After returning from his time reporting, he realized he missed the conversations he had had with strangers he met around the world.

Bakshi, along with his art collective Shared Studios, has operated the project in nearly 50 cities around the world. Notable project participants have included U.S. president Barack Obama, UN Secretary General Ban Ki-moon, and Google founder Sergey Brin.

Artist Amar Bakshi built the first Portal in 2014. He launched Portals in collaboration with fellow journalist Michelle Moghtader and Iranian artist Sohrab Kashani. Bakshi began construction of the first Portal in his parents’ backyard in Washington, D.C. The first project connected participants in Lu Magnus art gallery in New York City, USA and Sazmanab Center for Contemporary Art in Tehran, Iran, and was in place for two weeks.

Computer science professor Omid Habibi then became interested in the project and decided to create a Portal at Hariwa University in Herat, Afghanistan, which then launched in March 2015.

The project has since expanded to over 40 cities around the world.

Structure 
The videoconferencing has been done through different platforms, including Zoom. According to Bakshi, he originally had wanted to strip the shipping containers of paint, buff them, and repaint them, but this process proved to be too expensive and bad for the environment. The decision to paint the shipping containers gold emerged through trial and error. He previously experimented with painting the container black, white, and silver, but he decided on the color gold because he felt it conveyed “sacredness.”

In some locations the video conferencing equipment is housed inside an existing building rather than a shipping container. In other locations the project operates inside a gold, inflatable portal.

Participation in the project is free, and those who wish to participate can often make appointments prior to arrival. The sessions typically last 20 minutes, and participants are asked an open-ended questions such as “What would make today a good day for you?” to get the conversation going. Interactions are sometimes aided by text translations or in-person translators.

Notable Portal locations 

Portals have been placed at the following locations:

 Amman, Jordan, at Fablab 
 Aspen, USA at the 2016 Aspen Ideas Festival
 Austin, Texas at St. Edward's University and 2017 SXSW
 Baltimore, USA at Lexington Market
 Berlin, Germany at Tempelhof Airport
 Boulder, Colorado at University of Colorado Boulder
 Brooklyn, USA at the New Lab
 Chicago, USA at Chicago Ideas Week 2016
 College Park, USA at the University of Maryland
 El Progreso, Honduras with Organization for Youth Empowerment
 Erbil, Iraq at the Harsham IDP Camp with UNICEF
 Gaza City, Palestine at Gaza Sky Geeks
 Greenwich, USA at Greenwich Academy
 Havana, Cuba with Vistar Magazine
 Herat, Afghanistan at Hariwa University
 Isfahan, Iran
 Kigali, Rwanda at Impact Hub Kigali with Kurema Kureba Kwiga
 Los Angeles, USA at Grand Park
 London, UK at Campus London

 Mission, USA with Mission Economic Development District
 Mexico City, Mexico at Museo Tamayo and Center for Digital Culture
 Mumbai, India at the 2017 Mumbai Marathon
 Newark, USA at Military Park
 New York City, USA at the United Nations Headquarters, UNGA 2015 and UNGA 2016, Lu Magnus Gallery and Danese/Corey Gallery
 Oxford, UK at 2017 Skoll World Forum
 Park City, USA at the 2015 Sundance Film Festival with Airbnb
 Palo Alto, USA at Stanford University and the 2016 Global Entrepreneurship Summit with Google for Entrepreneurs
 Rye, USA at Rye Arts Center
 San Francisco, USA at ProxySF
 Seoul, South Korea at Campus Seoul
 Tehran, Iran at the Sazmanab Center for Contemporary Art</ref>
 Washington, DC at the U.S. Holocaust Memorial Museum, the U.S. Capitol, the Woodrow Wilson Plaza, and Georgetown University
 Yangon, Myanmar
 Za'atari, Jordan
 Davos, Switzerland (for the World Economic Forum)

Notable guests 

Portal participants include:

 Barack Obama
 Ban Ki-moon
 Haider Al-Abadi
 Samantha Power
 Ewan McGregor
 Fareed Zakaria
 Doug Liman
 Morgan Spurlock
 Amy Chua
 Robert Post
Vint Cerf
Tom Friedman
Samantha Power

References

External links
Official website

2014 in art
Public art
Visual arts